is a Japanese sport shooter. He was born in Kagoshima Prefecture. He won a bronze medal in 50 metre rifle three positions at the 1992 Summer Olympics in Barcelona. Koba was born in Kagoshima.

References

External links
 

1962 births
Living people
Sportspeople from Kagoshima Prefecture
Japanese male sport shooters
Olympic shooters of Japan
Olympic bronze medalists for Japan
Shooters at the 1984 Summer Olympics
Shooters at the 1988 Summer Olympics
Shooters at the 1992 Summer Olympics
Asian Games medalists in shooting
Shooters at the 1982 Asian Games
Shooters at the 1986 Asian Games
Shooters at the 1990 Asian Games
Shooters at the 1994 Asian Games
Shooters at the 1998 Asian Games
Japan Ground Self-Defense Force personnel
Medalists at the 1992 Summer Olympics
Asian Games gold medalists for Japan
Asian Games silver medalists for Japan
Asian Games bronze medalists for Japan
Medalists at the 1982 Asian Games
Medalists at the 1986 Asian Games
Medalists at the 1990 Asian Games
Medalists at the 1994 Asian Games
Medalists at the 1998 Asian Games
Olympic medalists in shooting
People from Kagoshima
20th-century Japanese people